Thoracistus peringueyi, the Peringuey's seedpod shieldback, is a species of katydid in the family Tettigoniidae. The species is endemic to South Africa, and is listed as critically endangered (possibly extinct). It is only known from a male and female specimen that were collected prior to 1879 from a location in Lydenburg district.

References

Insects described in 1888
Tettigoniidae
Endemic insects of South Africa